Marginix notatus is an extinct species of brittle star that lived in the Devonian seas of Brazil. Its name means "marked", in honor of the well-marked disc of this species. All known fossils of this brittle star were found in rocks of the Ponta Grossa Formation in state of Paraná. This is the third species designated for the genus Marginix.

References

Oegophiurida